Guy Gilchrist (born January 30, 1957 in Connecticut) is an American writer, artist, and musician, known for his children's books and comics. With his brother Brad, he produced a newspaper comic strip featuring The Muppets from 1981 to 1986 and the comic strip Nancy from 1995 to 2018 (the last 14 years as solo writer). He is the writer/illustrator of more than 60 children's books.

Career 
Gilchrist started his career in the late 1970s with Superkernel Comics, a monthly comic book published by Weekly Reader Publishing in Middletown, Connecticut. In addition to The Muppets and Nancy, his comics work includes Mudpie, Your Angels Speak, Night Lights & Pillow Fights, Screams, The Poetry Guy, The Rock Channel, and Today's Dogg. He won the National Cartoonist Society Magazine Award for 1998 1999, and was nominated for their Book Illustration Award for 1987 and 1993.

At various times in the 1980s and 1990s, Gilchrist managed the publishing and/or merchandising for such licenses as Pink Panther, Tom & Jerry, Looney Tunes, Teenage Mutant Ninja Turtles and Minnie Mouse.

He has designed logos for Minor League baseball teams, including the Portland Sea Dogs, Norwich Navigators, and New Britain Rock Cats, and also designed the J. League football team Shimizu S-Pulse's mascot, Palchan.

References

External links
 
 NCS Awards
 Guy Gilchrist: From The Muppets To Nancy, A Success Story. Tizziano Thomas Dossena, L'Idea Magazine, 2014

1957 births
American comics artists
American animators
American children's writers
American male songwriters
American country musicians
Living people
People from Connecticut